The 2014–15 North Carolina A&T Aggies men's basketball team represented North Carolina Agricultural and Technical State University during the 2014–15 NCAA Division I men's basketball season. The Aggies, led by third year head coach Cy Alexander, played their home games at the Corbett Sports Center and were members of the Mid-Eastern Athletic Conference. They finished the season 9–23, 6–10 in MEAC play to finish in a tie for ninth place. They lost in the first round of the MEAC tournament to South Carolina State.

Roster

Schedule

|-
!colspan=9 style="background:#002659; color:#FFBC00;"| Regular season

|-
!colspan=9 style="background:#002659; color:#FFBC00;"|  MEAC tournament

References

North Carolina A&T Aggies men's basketball seasons
North Carolina
North Carolina AandT Aggies men's basketball
North Carolina AandT Aggies men's basketball